Jarrod Spector (born April 16, 1981) is an American actor and singer.

Early life and education 
Spector was born in Philadelphia, Pennsylvania. He made his Broadway debut in Les Misérables, playing Gavroche.  Afterward, he studied economics at Princeton University and then returned to acting before completing his degree.

Career 
In 2007, he joined the 2nd San Francisco cast of Jersey Boys. Spector played Frankie Valli, a role he would play later in Chicago and on Broadway.

He appeared on Broadway in Beautiful: The Carole King Musical as Barry Mann from January 2014 to February 2016. He received a nomination for a 2014 Tony Award for Best Featured Actor in a Musical and a nomination for the 2014 Outer Critics Circle Award, Outstanding Featured Actor In A Musical for his portrayal of Barry Mann.

In 2016 he participated in the recording of the demo english version of the Death Note: The Musical. He sang L ‘s parts.

Spector and his wife Kelli Barrett perform a cabaret act together titled “This Is Dedicated: Music’s Greatest Marriages”, in March 2017 at the Scottsdale Center for the Performing Arts.

From 2018 to 2019 Spector starred as Sonny Bono in The Cher Show at the Neil Simon Theatre on Broadway.

Personal life 
Spector married fellow actor, Kelli Barrett, on October 26, 2014.

Theatre credits

Awards and nominations

References

External links 
Internet Broadway Database

1981 births
Male actors from Philadelphia
American male musical theatre actors
Living people
People from Montgomery County, Pennsylvania
Germantown Academy alumni